Luciano Sánchez may refer to:
 Vavá II, Spanish retired forward
 Luciano Sánchez (footballer, born January 1994), Argentine defender
 Luciano Sánchez (footballer, born September 1994), Argentine defender